Rawee Udomsilp (born February 27, 1997) is a Thai professional footballer who plays as a forward.

References

External links
 

1997 births
Living people
Rawee Udomsilp
Association football forwards
Rawee Udomsilp
Rawee Udomsilp
Rawee Udomsilp